A tall ship is a large, traditionally-rigged sailing vessel. Popular modern tall ship rigs include topsail schooners, brigantines, brigs and barques. "Tall ship" can also be defined more specifically by an organization, such as for a race or festival.

History

Traditional rigging may include square rigs and gaff rigs, usually with separate topmasts and topsails. It is generally more complex than modern rigging, which utilizes newer materials such as aluminum and steel to construct taller, lightweight masts with fewer, more versatile sails. Most smaller, modern vessels use the Bermuda rig. Though it did not become popular elsewhere until the twentieth century, this rig was developed in Bermuda in the seventeenth century, and had historically been used on its small ships, the Bermuda sloops.

Author and master mariner Joseph Conrad (who spent 1874 to 1894 at sea in tall ships and was quite particular about naval terminology) used the term "tall ship" in his works; for example, in The Mirror of the Sea in 1906.  

Henry David Thoreau also references the term "tall ship" in his first work, A Week on the Concord and Merrimack Rivers, quoting "Down out at its mouth, the dark inky main blending with the blue above. Plum Island, its sand ridges scolloping along the horizon like the sea-serpent, and the distant outline broken by many a tall ship, leaning, still, against the sky." He does not cite this quotation, but the work was written in 1849.

While Sail Training International (STI) has extended the definition of tall ship for the purpose of its races to embrace any sailing vessel with more than  waterline length and on which at least half the people on board are aged 15 to 25.

Sail Training International

In the 21st century, "tall ship" is often used generically for large, classic, sailing vessels, but is also a technically defined term by Sail Training International for its purposes and STI helped popularize the term. The exact definitions have changed somewhat over time, and are subject to various technicalities, but by 2011 there were 4 classes (A, B, C, and D). There are only two size classes, A is over 40 m LOA, and B/C/D are 9.14 m to under 40 m LOA. The definitions have to do with rigging: class A is for square sail rigged ships, class B is for "traditionally rigged" ships, class C is for "modern rigged" vessels with no "spinnaker-like sails", and class D is the same as class C but carrying a spinnaker-like sail.

Class A

All square-rigged vessels (barque, barquentine, brig, brigantine or ship rigged) and all other vessels more than 40 metres length overall (LOA), regardless of rig. STI classifies its A Class as "all square-rigged vessels and all other vessels over  length overall (LOA)", in this case STI LOA excludes bowsprit and aft spar.  STI defines LOA as "Length overall measured from the fore side of stem post
to aft side of stern post, counter or transom".

Class B
Traditionally rigged vessels (i.e. gaff rigged sloops, ketches, yawls and schooners) with an LOA of less than 40 metres and with a waterline length (LWL) of at least 9.14 metres, one good example is Spirit of Bermuda.

Class C
Modern rigged vessels (i.e. Bermudan rigged sloops, ketches, yawls and schooners) with an LOA of less than 40 metres and with a waterline length (LWL) of at least 9.14 metres not carrying spinnaker-like sails.

Class D
Modern rigged vessels (i.e. Bermudan-rigged sloops, ketches, yawls and schooners) with an LOA of less than 40 metres and with a waterline length (LWL) of at least 9.14 metres carrying spinnaker-like sails. There are also a variety of other rules and regulations for the crew, such as ages, and also for a rating rule. There are other sail festivals and races with their own standards, the STI is just one set of standards for their purposes.

Earlier description of classes
An older definition of class "A" by the STI was "all square-rigged vessels over 120′ (36.6 m) length overall (LOA). Fore and aft rigged vessels of 160′ (48.8 m) (LOA) and over". By LOA they meant length excluding bowsprit and aft spar.

Class "B" was "all fore and aft rigged vessels between 100 and 160 feet in length, and all square rigged vessels under 120′ (36.6 m) (LOA)".

See also a list of class "A" ships with lengths including bowsprit.

Lost tall ships
Tall ships are sometimes lost, such as by a storm at sea. Some examples of lost tall ships include:

 Asgard II, an Irish national sail training ship, commissioned in 1982, was lost in 2008 off the French coast. The two-masted brigantine is thought to have collided with a submerged object.
 Astrid ran aground in 2013 off Ireland, and then broke up in 2014 after being salvaged
 Bounty, a full-rig ship lost off the North Carolina coast as Hurricane Sandy approached in 2012.
 Concordia, a triple-mast barquentine built in 1992 and operated by Canada as a school ship; lost at sea in 2010, in a squall.
 Endeavour II, built in 1968; wrecked in a 1971 gale off New Zealand
 Fantome, a former yacht built in 1927, then operated as a cruise ship. Was lost in Hurricane Mitch in 1998.
 Lennie, built in 1871, ran aground on Digby Neck in 1889.
 Marques, built in 1917;  was lost in a 1984 Tall Ships Race.

Gallery

See also
American Sail Training Association
Cutty Sark Tall Ships' Race
Jubilee Sailing Trust
List of large sailing vessels
Operation Sail
Sail training
SAIL Amsterdam
Tall Ships Challenge
Tall Ship Chronicles
Tall Ships Youth Trust
The Tall Ships' Races
Windjammer

References

Further reading
 American Sail Training Association; Sail Tall Ships! (American Sail Training Association; 16th edition, 2005 )
 Thad Koza; Tall Ships: A Fleet for the 21st Century (Tide-Mark Press; 3rd edition, 2002)

External links

 American Sail Training Association
 Another World Adventures

 
Lists of sailing ships
Sailing rigs and rigging
Ship types

pl:Żaglowiec